Al-Maktoum Stadium is a multi-purpose stadium in Dubai, United Arab Emirates.  It is currently used mostly for football matches and is the home ground of Al Nasr SC. The stadium holds roughly 15,000 people.

It was upgraded for the 2019 AFC Asian Cup.

2019 AFC Asian Cup
Al Maktoum Stadium hosted six games of the 2019 AFC Asian Cup, including a Round of 16 and a quarter-final match.

Dubai Super Cup
Al Maktoum Stadium hosted the final of the Dubai Super Cup in December 2022, where Arsenal F.C. won against AC Milan with a score of 2–1.

References

External links
WorldStadiums.com
Stadium images

AFC Asian Cup stadiums
Football venues in the United Arab Emirates
Sports venues in Dubai
Multi-purpose stadiums in the United Arab Emirates